The anime series D.N.Angel is adapted from the manga of the same name written and illustrated by Yukiru Sugisaki. Produced by Dentsu and Xebec and directed by Koji Yoshikawa and Nobuyoshi Habara, the series premiered in Japan on TV Tokyo on April 3, 2003. It ran for twenty-six episodes until its conclusion on September 25, 2003.

The series is licensed for release in North American and the United Kingdom by ADV Films, and in Australia and New Zealand by Madman Entertainment.

Five pieces of theme music are used in the anime adaptation. The song , by Shunichi Miyamoto, is used for the opening for all twenty six episodes. Both songs are performed by Minawo. Episode 24 uses the song "Caged Bird", by Shunichi Miyamoto, for its ending, while the final episode of the series uses Miyamoto's song .

The table below shows where and when the 26-episode anime was shown on television:

Episode listing

See also
 List of D.N.Angel chapters
 List of D.N.Angel characters

References

External links
Official JVC Music D.N.Angel anime website 
Official ADV Films D.N.Angel anime website

D.N.Angel

ru:Код ангела#Аниме